Gal Gorenak (born 24 October 2003) is a Slovenian football midfielder who plays for Slovenian Second League side Aluminij, on loan from Maribor.

References

External links
NZS profile 

2003 births
Living people
Slovenian footballers
Association football midfielders
Slovenia youth international footballers
NK Maribor players
ND Ilirija 1911 players
NK Aluminij players
Slovenian PrvaLiga players
Slovenian Second League players